Eupithecia sinuosaria, the goosefoot pug, is a moth of the family Geometridae. It is endemic to Eastern Asia, but has expanded its range to Central Europe.

The length of the fore-wings is 10–12 mm. The moth flies from June to August depending on the location.

The larvae feed on Chenopodium album, Chenopodium pratericola, Chenopodium hybridum, Chenopodium glaucum, Atriplex patula and Polygonum aviculare.

Subspecies
Eupithecia sinuosaria sinuosaria
Eupithecia sinuosaria obliquaria Leech, 1897
Eupithecia sinuosaria tenella Vojnits, 1976

References

External links
Vlindernet 

Moths described in 1848
sinuosaria
Moths of Europe
Moths of Asia